The 1897–98 season was the 27th season of competitive football in England.

Honours

Notes = Number in parentheses is the times that club has won that honour. * indicates new record for competition

Football League

First Division

Sheffield United won the First Division to become champions of English football for the only time in their history.

Second Division

This was the final season of using 'Test Matches' to decide relegation and promotion between the divisions. 
The Second Division was won by Burnley; both they and runners-up Newcastle United were promoted to the expanded First Division, rendering the results of the end of season Test Matches meaningless. From the 1898–99 season onwards, automatic relegation and promotion of the bottom two/top two sides from each division was introduced.

Luton Town replaced Burton Wanderers.

References